Alejandro Enríquez, also known as Junior Enríquez Franco (born 17 January 2000 in Guatemala City) is a Guatemalan professional squash player. As of May 2022, he was ranked number 183 in the world. He won the 2022 Squash Inn Classic.

References

2000 births
Living people
Guatemalan male squash players